Dams and reservoirs in Australia is a link page for any dam or reservoir in Australia.

Australian Capital Territory
There are three key water storage facilities located in the Australian Capital Territory. The fourth source of water for Canberra, Googong Dam, is in NSW. In addition, there are four smaller man-made reservoirs used for recreation and as traps for sediment and fertilizers
.

New South Wales
There are  dams, weirs, catchments, and barrages in New South Wales. Of these, 135 facilities are considered major dams according to the Australian National Committee on Large Dams.

Dams and reservoirs
The largest reservoir in New South Wales is the  Lake Eucumbene in the Snowy Mountains, formed by the Eucumbene Dam.

Weirs and barrages

Cancelled and decommissioned

Northern Territory
There are 805 named water storage facilities located in the Northern Territory. Of these, four facilities are considered major dams according to the Australian National Committee on Large Dams.

Queensland

Dams and reservoirs
There are 183 key water storage facilities located in Queensland. This does not include privately owned off-stream storage sites used for water harvesting.

Weirs and barrages

South Australia

Adelaide catchment
Barossa Reservoir – The Whispering Wall
Clarendon Weir
Happy Valley Reservoir
Hope Valley Reservoir
Kangaroo Creek Reservoir
Little Para Reservoir
Millbrook Reservoir
Mount Bold Reservoir
Myponga Reservoir
South Para Reservoir
Thorndon Park Reservoir (Adelaide's first reservoir, built in 1860, decommissioned and reestablished as a recreational park in 1986)
Warren Reservoir

Regional South Australia
Aroona Dam
Baroota Reservoir
Beetaloo Reservoir
Bundaleer Reservoir
Blue Lake
Goolwa Barrages
Hindmarsh Valley
Middle River Reservoir
Tod Reservoir

Tasmania
There are 103 dams in Tasmania. Of these, 100 facilities are considered major dams according to the Australian National Committee on Large Dams.

Dams and reservoirs
The largest reservoir in Tasmania is the  Lake Gordon in the South West region of the state, formed by the Gordon Dam. , 44 per cent of all the dams in Tasmania were constructed for the purpose of generating hydro-electricity.

Victoria

Melbourne Water area

Anakie Gorge
Cardinia Reservoir
Devilbend Reservoir
Greenvale Reservoir
Melton reservoir
Maroondah Reservoir
O'Shannassy Reservoir
Silvan Reservoir
Sugarloaf Reservoir
Tarago Reservoir
Thomson Dam
Toorourrong Reservoir
Upper Yarra Reservoir
Yan Yean Reservoir

Regional Victoria
Blue Rock Dam
Cairn Curran Reservoir
Dartmouth Dam
Lake Eildon
Lake Eppalock
Glenmaggie Dam
Goulburn Weir
Laanecoorie Weir
Lauriston Reservoir
Malmsbury Reservoir
Moondara Reservoir
Rocklands Reservoir
Upper Coliban Reservoir
Waranga Basin
William Hovell Dam

Barwon Water area

Allen Reservoir
Bostock Reservoir
Korweinguboora Reservoir
Marengo Basin
Painkalac Reservoir
Stony Creek Reservoirs
West Barwon Reservoir
West Gellibrand and Olangolah Reservoirs and No. 4 & No.5 Basins
Wurdee Boluc Reservoir

Western Australia

Metropolitan Supply

Great Southern Region

South West Region

See also
List of dams and reservoirs
Lakes of Australia
Lakes and Reservoirs in Melbourne

References

External links

Melbourne Water Reservoirs
Sydney Dam levels and statistics
Dams of Western Australia
SE Queensland Dam Levels
Lake Awoonga, Via Benaraby near Gladstone in Central Queensland

 
 
Australia
Dams
Reservoirs
 *
Dams and reservoirs